Robidoux is a surname of French-Canadian origin. Notable people with this surname include:

Alain Robidoux
André Robidoux
Billy Jo Robidoux
David Robidoux
Ferdinand-Joseph Robidoux
Florent Robidoux
Joseph Robidoux I
Joseph Robidoux II
Joseph Robidoux III
Joseph Robidoux IV
Joseph-Émery Robidoux
Louis Rubidoux
Manuel Robidoux
William (Guillaume) Robidoux

See also
Roubidoux Creek
Robidoux Pass
Robidoux Row